Jacopo Luppi (born 12 August 1992) is an Italian footballer who plays as a midfielder.

Career

Youth career
Born in Bologna, the capital of Emilia–Romagna region, Jacopo Luppi started his career at Bologna F.C. 1909. J.Luppi was in the Bologna U17 team for 2008–09 national student league (Allievi). Co-currently with Davide Luppi formally left the club in 2009 after a loan, Jacopo was a member of the reserve team from 2009 to 2011. However, he only made 16 appearances in the group stage of the "spring" reserve league.

Bologna–Cesena swap
On 29 June 2011, one day before the closure of 2010–11 financial year, Bologna formed two swap deals with A.C. Cesena, which J.Luppi was transferred to the Romagna along with Giacomo Bassoli in co-ownership deal for €750,000 and €1 million respectively. The Emilia club, signed Kadir Caidi and Angelo Gregorio in the same formula. The all four players signed a 3-year contract. The deal made both clubs had an immediately financial boost and a speculative investment.

Lega Pro loan
On 5 August 2011 J.Luppi left for Bellaria in temporary deal from Cesena/Bologna as well as Thomas Fabbri from Parma/Cesena and Marcello Scarponi, Michele Gabbianelli from Cesena. The Romagna club also retained Alessio Briglia who already transferred to Cesena in March 2011. Moreover, the team was coached by the brother of Cesena president, Nicola Campedelli.

Circa July 2013 Luppi was released by Cesena one year early from his contract.

Footnotes

References

External links
 Football.it Profile 

Italian footballers
Bologna F.C. 1909 players
A.C. Bellaria Igea Marina players
Association football midfielders
Footballers from Bologna
1992 births
Living people